Crnice is a settlement in the Kisela Voda Municipality in the Republic of Macedonia, which shares borders with the settlements Przino and Kisela Voda. It is home to more than 300 residents.

Places 
- Elementary School "Kuzman Josifovski - Pitu"

- Church "St. Paraskevi - Crnice

Demographics 
A large number of Crnice residents are Macedonians.

Villages in North Macedonia